The BMW K1300R is a naked motorcycle made by BMW from 2008 to 2015. When launched, it replaced the K1200R as BMW's flagship urban motorcycle. BMW says the K1300R produces  @ 9,250 rpm and  torque @ 8,250 rpm from its  inline-four engine. The engine was subtly modified by British company Ricardo plc.
It has an exhaust butterfly flap to boost torque and improve exhaust note. The K1300R features BMW's optional ESA-II electronic suspension adjustment. The bike also has a conventional indicator switch instead of the usual BMW three button configuration.

The K1300R is considered a muscle bike, a slang term for naked or standard motorcycles that put an emphasis on high power output and fast acceleration. Its close gearing and exceptionally broad power delivery provide the drive output power necessary to accelerate quickly, while its long wheelbase and low and canted mounted engine help the motorcycle plant the power without unintentional power wheelies. In tests carried out by Bike Magazine in the UK, its 2.81 second  time made it the fastest accelerating naked motorcycle, beating its next closest competitor, the Suzuki B-King, by one tenth of a second.

Throughout its production run, K1300R has never been offered for sale in the United States despite being offered in the smaller Canadian market.

In Popular Culture

On 20 December 2013, Bollywood film Dhoom 3 featured a modified BMW K1300R ridden by Aamir Khan.

References

External links
BMW official K1300R web page
K1300R review by Motorcycle News

K1200R
Shaft drive motorcycles
Standard motorcycles